The men's individual time trial competition at the 1998 Asian Games was held on 10 December.

Schedule
All times are Indochina Time (UTC+07:00)

Results

References

External links 
Results

Road Men ITT